is a Japanese actor.

Filmography

Film
 Begging for Love (1998)
 Give It All (1998)
 Ring 2 (1999) - Dr. Kawajiri
 Audition (1999) - Television producer
 Minna no Ie (2001)
 Turn (2001)
 Dark Water (2002) - Kunio Hamada
 The Mars Canon (2002) - Kōhei Deguchi
 Casshern (2004) - Professor Kōzuki
 69 (2004) - Yoshioka
 Swing Girls (2004) - Yasumi Suzuki (Tomoko's father)
 Kagen no Tsuki (2004) - Anzai
 Be with You (2004) - Dr. Noguchi
 Ashurajō no Hitomi (2005) - Nanboku Tsuruya IV
 Always Sanchōme no Yūhi (2005) - Kawabuchi
 Rainbow Song (2006) - Yasujirō Satō
 I Just Didn't Do It (2007) - Shōgo Muroyama
 Hero (2007) - Takayuki Suetsugu
 Always Zoku Sanchōme no Yūhi (2007) - Kawabuchi
 My Girlfriend Is a Cyborg (2008) - TV Reporter
 The Magic Hour (2008) - Kenjūrō Hasegawa
 Happy Flight (2008) - Sadao Mochizuki
 K-20: Legend of the Mask (2008)
 Goemon (2009) - Yashichi
 Saidoweizu (2009) - Michio Saito
 About Her Brother (2010) - Susumu Komiyama
 Outrage (2010) - Detective Kataoka
 Sword of Desperation (2010) - Hoshina Jūnai
 Smuggler (2011) - Kenji Nishio
 A Ghost of a Chance (2011) - Jōji Danda
 Ace Attorney (2012) - Kōtarō Haine
 Beyond Outrage (2012) - Detective Kataoka
 The Kiyosu Conference (2013) - Niwa Nagahide
 Akumu-chan (2014) - Bannosuke Kotō
 Lady Maiko (2014) - Kanpachiro Ichikawa
 Solomon's Perjury 1: Suspicion (2015) - Tsuzaki
 Solomon's Perjury 2: Judgment (2015) - Tsuzaki
 Mozu The Movie (2015)
 Persona Non Grata (2015)
 Prophecy (2015)
 Fullmetal Alchemist (2017) - Hakuro
 Survival Family (2017) - Yoshiyuki Suzuki
 Mixed Doubles (2017)
 Mary and the Witch's Flower (2017) - Doctor Dee (voice)
 The Crimes That Bind (2018) - Tadao Asai
 Restaurant from the Sky (2018)
 Masquerade Hotel (2019)
 Kazokuwari (2019)
 The Confidence Man JP: The Movie (2019) - Richard
 The Great War of Archimedes (2019) - Sekizō Uno
 Talking the Pictures (2019)
 The Confidence Man JP: Episode of the Princess (2020) - Richard
 Caution, Hazardous Wife: The Movie (2021)
 The Confidence Man JP: Episode of the Hero (2022) - Richard
 Masquerade Night (2021)
 It's in the Woods (2022)
 Yudō (2023)
 Ichikei's Crow: The Movie (2023) - Yoshio Komazawa
 Daimyō Tōsan (2023) - Magaki Sakubei
 Emergency Interrogation Room: The Final (2023) - Haruo Koishikawa

Television dramas
 Mōri Motonari (NHK, 1997) - Kimura
 Tokugawa Yoshinobu (NHK, 1998) - Nishi Amane
 Rokubanme no Sayoko (NHK, 2000) - Mita
 Hero (Fuji TV, 2001) - Takayuki Suetsugu
 Shinsengumi! (NHK, 2004) - Satō Hikogorō
 Kisarazu Cat's Eye (TBS, 2002) - Kōsuke Tabuchi
 Boku no Ikiru Michi (Fuji TV, 2003) - Benzō Kaneda
 Orange Days (TBS, 2004) - Professor Sakaida
 Water Boys 2 (Fuji TV, 2004) - Akira Yazawa
 Ruri no Shima (NTV, 2005) - Teruaki Yonemori
 Ganbatte Ikimasshoi (Fuji TV, 2005) - Mitsuru Nemoto
 Attention Please (Fuji TV, 2006) - Shinya Sakurada
 Fūrin Kazan (NHK, 2007) - Suwa Yorishige
 Taiyo to Umi no Kyoshitsu (Fuji TV, 2008) - Ryunosuke Kamiya
 81diver (Fuji TV, 2008) - Fuhito Suzuki
 Jin (TBS, 2009) - Katsu Kaishū
 Wagaya no Rekishi (Fuji TV, 2010) - Nobusuke Kishi
 Hammer Session! (TBS, 2010) - Kenichi Mizuki
 Bull Doctor (NTV, 2011) - Nobuo Takeda
 Watashi wa Shadow (TBS, 2011) - Taisuke Fujimoto
 Akumu-chan (NTV, 2012) - Bannosuke Kotō
 Taira no Kiyomori (NHK, 2012) - Minamoto no Tameyoshi
 Doctors (TV Asahi, 2013) - Professor Matsuda 
 Hero (Fuji TV, 2014) - Takayuki Suetsugu
 Emergency Interrogation Room (TV Asahi, 2014–2021) - Haruo Koishikawa
 Mare (NHK, 2015) - Daigo Ikehata
 Sanada Maru (NHK, 2016) - Toyotomi Hideyoshi
 Love That Makes You Cry (Fuji TV, 2016) - Seijirō Ibuki
 Sleepeeer Hit! (TBS, 2016) - Ryu Mikurayama
 The Prime Minister's Chef (TV Asahi, 2016), Prime Minister Ichirō Atō
 Miotsukushi Ryōrichō (NHK, 2017)
 The Confidence Man JP (Fuji TV, 2018)
 The Supporting Actors 2 (TV Tokyo, 2018)
 Legal V (TV Asahi, 2018)
 Tegami (TV Tokyo, 2018)
 Maison de Police (TBS, 2019)
 An Artist of the Floating World (NHK, 2019)
 The Eternal Nispa (NHK, 2019) - Nabeshima Naomasa
 The Dangerous Venus (TBS, 2020)
 Ichikei's Crow: The Criminal Court Judges (Fuji TV, 2021) - Yoshio Komazawa
 Kyojo 2 (Fuji TV, 2021), Hideo Yomoda
 The Days (Netflix, 2023), the prime minister
 Kyojo 0 (Fuji TV, 2023), Hideo Yomoda

Television animation
 Inuyashiki (Fuji TV, 2017) - Ichirō Inuyashiki

References

External links
 Official Site 

1954 births
Japanese male film actors
Japanese male television actors
Living people
Actors from Hokkaido
People from Mikasa, Hokkaido
20th-century Japanese male actors
21st-century Japanese male actors